David Palmer may refer to:

 David Palmer (American football) (born 1972), running back
 David Palmer (baseball) (born 1957), baseball pitcher
 David Palmer (curler) (born 1960), American wheelchair curler
 David Palmer (squash player) (born 1976), Australian squash player
 David Palmer (vocalist), American vocalist with Steely Dan
 Dave Palmer (keyboardist), session musician
 David R. Palmer (born 1941), American science fiction author
 Dave Richard Palmer (born 1934), US Army Lieutenant General
 Dee Palmer, British arranger and keyboardist, formerly David Palmer of Jethro Tull
 David Palmer, British drummer and former member of ABC

Fictional
 David Palmer (24 character), president of the U.S. in the television series 24